Colombes is a railway station in the town Colombes, Hauts-de-Seine department, in the northwestern suburbs of Paris, France.

External links
 

Railway stations in Hauts-de-Seine